The 2013–14 Biathlon World Cup – World Cup 1 is the opening event of the season and is held in Östersund, Sweden, from 24 November until 1 December 2013.

Schedule of events 

 The Women's 15 km Individual was postponed from November 27 17:15 CET to November 28 due to bad weather.

Medal winners

Men

Women

Mixed

Achievements 

 Best performance for all time

 , 31st place in Sprint
 , 48th place in Sprint
 , 5th place in Individual
 , 8th place in Individual
 , 15th place in Individual
 , 20th place in Individual
 , 21st place in Individual
 , 33rd place in Individual
 , 39th place in Individual
 , 52nd place in Individual
 , 5th place in Sprint
 , 27th place in Sprint

 First World Cup race

 , 40th place in Individual
 , 44th place in Individual
 , 54th place in Individual
 , 81st place in Individual

References 

Biathlon World Cup
2013–14 Biathlon World Cup
November 2013 sports events in Europe
December 2013 sports events in Europe
Sports competitions in Östersund
Biathlon competitions in Sweden